Berliner Singakademie, consisting of nearly 90 singers, is one of the largest amateur choirs in Berlin. It sees itself in the tradition of Sing-Akademie zu Berlin, founded in 1791 and still existing. The choir sings Renaissance, Baroque, Classical, Romantic, Modern and Contemporary music. The choir was founded in 1963 by Helmut Koch. Since 1989, Achim Zimmermann is its director.

External links 
  (German language)

Musical groups from Berlin
German choirs
Musical groups established in 1963
1963 establishments in East Germany